Henry Worrall (26 February 1862 – 26 May 1940) was an Australian Methodist minister, Orangeman and temperance advocate. Worrall was born in Hartshead, Lancashire, England and died in Canterbury, Melbourne, Victoria.

See also

 Sir Thomas Bent
 Sir Philip Fysh
 Sir Samuel Gillott
 Sir Frank Madden
 Daniel Mannix

References

1862 births
1940 deaths
Wesleyan Theological Institute alumni
Australian Methodist ministers
Australian temperance activists
English emigrants to colonial Australia
Clergy from Lancashire